If You Leave It Alone is the eighth album by The Wave Pictures, their second on Moshi Moshi Records.

Track listing
Songs written by David Tattersall except "Nothing Can Change This Love" by Sam Cooke.

 "If You Leave It Alone"
 "Canary Wharf"
 "My Kiss"
 "I Thought Of You Again"
 "Tiny Craters In The Sand"
 "Bumble Bee"
 "Come On Daniel"
 "Too Many Questions"
 "Bye Bye Bubble Belly"
 "Softly You, Softly Me"
 "Strawberry Cables"
 "Nothing Can Change This Love"

Personnel
David Tattersall - Guitar, Vocals
Franic Rozycki - Bass Guitar, Backing Vocals
Jonny Helm - Drums, Backing Vocals
Stanley Brinks - Trumpets, Clarinets, Saxophones, German Banjo, Backing Vocals
Clemence Freschard - Additional Percussions, Backing Vocals, Queer Flute
Toby Goodshank - Harmony on "Canary Wharf" and "Tiny Craters In The Sand"
Isabel Martin - Harmony on "Tiny Craters In The Sand"

References

2009 albums
The Wave Pictures albums